Catharanthus pusillus, commonly known as the tiny periwinkle, is a species of flowering plant in the family Apocynaceae. It is native to India and Sri Lanka.

References

pusillus